Asadabad (also Romanized as Asadābād) is a village in Dodangeh Rural District, in the Central District of Behbahan County, Khuzestan Province, Iran. At the 2006 census, its population was 1,188, in 223 families.

References 

Populated places in Behbahan County